Al Jones may refer to:
Al Jones (Negro leagues), American baseball player
Al Jones (English musician) (Alun Jones, 1945–2008), English folk and blues singer, songwriter and guitarist
Al Jones (1980s pitcher) (born 1959), American former professional baseball player
Alfred Jones (boxer) (born 1946), American former Olympic boxer
Al Jones (drummer) (1930–1976), American jazz drummer

See also
Alan Jones (disambiguation)
Alun Jones (disambiguation)
Allen Jones (disambiguation)
Allan Jones (disambiguation)
Alfred Jones (disambiguation)
Albert Jones (disambiguation)